The Teaneck Public Schools is comprehensive community public school district serving students in pre-kindergarten through twelfth grade in Teaneck, Bergen County, New Jersey, United States.

As of the 2019–20 school year, the district, comprised of seven schools, had an enrollment of 3,720 students and 347.3 classroom teachers (on an FTE basis), for a student–teacher ratio of 10.7:1.

The district is classified by the New Jersey Department of Education as being in District Factor Group "GH", the third-highest of eight groupings. District Factor Groups organize districts statewide, ostensibly to allow comparison by common socioeconomic characteristics of the local districts. From lowest socioeconomic status to highest, the categories are A, B, CD, DE, FG, GH, I and J. However, because socioeconomic data is derived from the municipality as a whole and a significant proportion of Teaneck's more affluent families send their children to parochial or other private schools, the usefulness of District Factor Grouping in the Teaneck district's case is disputed.

Awards and recognition
The Teaneck Public Schools have been recognized by the New Jersey Department of Education as part of its Best practices program. The district was awarded in the 1997–98 school year for its Passport Portfolio Program, and in the 2000–01 school year for its Early Literacy Initiative.

History
Harvey B. Scribner, who later served as New York City School Chancellor, was hired in 1961 by the Teaneck Public Schools to serve as superintendent of the district. There he oversaw the adoption of mandatory busing in 1965 in which Teaneck voluntarily integrated its public schools. Despite angry phone calls from some parents and the occasional death threat, Teaneck's integration went smoothly and Scribner recalled that he was "literally crying" on the first day of school in 1965 when buses rolled into school without incident. Teaneck's 1965 busing plan was widely reported as the first district in the nation with a white majority to implement a voluntary school integration program.

A 1982 teachers strike that lasted for 19 days was settled after a judge threatened to jail striking teachers and pressured the board of education to negotiate an agreement.

Schools
Schools in the district, with 2019–20 enrollment data from the National Center for Education Statistics, are:

Elementary schools
 Bryant School (322 students in pre-K and Kindergarten) 
Built in 1927, the school is named for poet and journalist William Cullen Bryant. 
School #6
Leslie Abrew, Principal
 Hawthorne School (345 students in grades 1–4)
Built in 1925, the school is named for author Nathaniel Hawthorne. 
School #5
Natasha T. Pitt, Principal
 Lowell School (336 students in grades 1–4) 
Built in 1935, the school is named for author James Russell Lowell. 
School #7
Antoine Green, Principal
 Whittier School (359 students in grades 1–4) 
Built in 1923, the school is named for John Greenleaf Whittier. 
School #4
Pedro Valdes, Principal
 Theodora Smiley Lacey School 
Opened in 2020

Middle schools
 Benjamin Franklin Middle School (555 students in grades 5–8)
Named for founding father and inventor Benjamin Franklin.
Terrence Williams, Principal
 Thomas Jefferson Middle School (523 students in grades 5–8) 
Named for American president Thomas Jefferson.
Nina Odatalla, Principal

High school
 Teaneck High School (1,189 students in grades 9–12) 
Built in 1929
Clifton Thompson, Principal

Defunct schools
 Eugene Field School – Constructed in 1956. Used as Board of Education Central Administration Offices. School #8. Named for poet and humorist Eugene Field.
 Emerson Elementary School – Built in 1916. Original School #3. Named for author, essayist, and 19th century philosopher Ralph Waldo Emerson.
 Washington Irving School – Built in 1906. Original School #2. Named for author Washington Irving.
 Longfellow Elementary School – Built in 1910. School #1. Named for poet Henry Wadsworth Longfellow.

Controversy
Teaneck has received attention in the media due to sexual crimes committed against minors by faculty members. Joseph White, former principal of Teaneck High School, pleaded guilty to official child endangerment in June 2006 and was sentenced to one year in prison. White had been charged in 2002 with fondling a 17-year-old student and was subsequently acquitted. James Darden, an award-winning former eighth grade teacher at Thomas Jefferson Middle School, was charged with sexual assault and misconduct in June 2007. He pleaded guilty in December 2007 to a charge of aggravated sexual assault and faces up to 8 years in prison when sentenced on January 18, 2008.

Administration
Core members of the district's administration are:
Barbara Pinsak, Interim Superintendent
Dora E. Zeno, Interim School Business Administrator / Board Secretary

As of July 1, 2022, former superintendent Barbara Pinsak was hired on an interim basis to replace Dr. Christopher C. Irving.

Board of education
The district's board of education, comprised of nine members, sets policy and oversees the fiscal and educational operation of the district through its administration. As a Type II school district, the board's trustees are elected directly by voters to serve three-year terms of office on a staggered basis, with three seats up for election each year held (since 2012) as part of the November general election. The board appoints a superintendent to oversee the district's day-to-day operations and a business administrator to supervise the business functions of the district.

References

External links
 Teaneck Public Schools
 Teaneck Virtual Village - History of Teaneck Public Schools
 
 School Data for the Teaneck Public Schools, National Center for Education Statistics

Teaneck, New Jersey
New Jersey District Factor Group GH
School districts in Bergen County, New Jersey